= New Zealand national rugby team =

New Zealand national rugby team may refer to national teams in the different varieties of rugby:

- New Zealand national rugby union team, better known as the All Blacks, administered by the New Zealand Rugby Football Union.
  - New Zealand national rugby sevens team compete in the World Sevens Series
- New Zealand national rugby league team, often nicknamed the Kiwis, administered by New Zealand Rugby League.
